
John Archer may refer to:

Law
John L'Archers (died 1349), English cleric and judge in Ireland
Sir John Archer (judge) (1598–1682), English judge

Politics
John Archer (American politician) (1741–1810), U.S. congressman from Maryland
John Archer (British politician) (1863–1932), British politician, one of the first persons of African descent elected to public office
John Archer (New Zealand politician) (1865–1949), New Zealand politician
John W. Archer (politician), American politician, member of the Maryland House of Delegates, 1910–1911

Academia
John Hall Archer (1914–2004), Canadian archivist and historian, president of the University of Regina
John Stuart Archer (1943–2007), British petroleum engineer, vice-chancellor of Heriot-Watt University, 1997–2006

Entertainment
John Archer (actor) (1915–1999), American film and television actor
John Archer (magician), British comedy magician

Sport
John Archer (basketball) (died 1998), head basketball coach of the Troy State Trojans, 1956–1973
John Archer (footballer, born 1936) (1936–1987), English football goalkeeper
John Archer (footballer, born 1941) (1941–2021), English football striker

Others
Henry Archer (Fifth Monarchist) (died c. 1642), also known as John Archer, English Puritan
John Archer (physician), English court physician in the reign of Charles II
John Lee Archer (1791–1852), British-born architect and engineer in Van Diemen's Land
John Wykeham Archer (1808–1864), British artist, engraver and writer
Sir John Archer (British Army officer) (1924–1999), British Army general

Fictional characters
John Archer, a character in British radio drama The Archers, killed in a tractor accident in 1998

See also
John Archer-Houblon (1773–1831), MP for Essex
Jack Archer (disambiguation)
Jonathan Archer, captain of the Enterprise (NX-01) in Star Trek: Enterprise
Archer (surname)